Forum Geometricorum: A Journal on Classical Euclidean Geometry is a peer-reviewed open-access academic journal that specializes in mathematical research papers on Euclidean geometry.

Its founding editor-in-chief was Paul Yiu, a professor of mathematics at Florida Atlantic, now retired. All papers are available online immediately upon acceptance through the journal's web site.

, Forum Geometricorum is no longer accepting submissions. Prior issues are still available.

See also
 International Journal of Geometry

References

External links
 

Mathematics journals
Open access journals
Publications established in 2001
Florida Atlantic University
English-language journals